Events from the year 1723 in art.

Events
Following Sir Godfrey Kneller's death, the Irish-born Charles Jervas succeeds him as Principal Portrait Painter to King George I of Great Britain.
Scottish-born painter William Aikman settles in London as a portraitist under the patronage of John Campbell, Duke of Argyll.
Sculptor Mario Diamanti begins work on the monumental façade of St. Sebastian, Palazzolo Acreide, Sicily.

Paintings
William Aikman – Portrait of Lady Anne Cochrane
Canaletto – Architectural Capriccio (his first known signed and dated work)
Thomas Gibson – Portrait of George Vertue
François Lemoyne - Perseus and Andromeda
Jean Ranc – The Family of Philip V
Christian Friedrich Zincke – Catherine Edwin (miniature)

Births
February 3 – Catherine Read, Scottish portrait-painter (died 1778)
April 12 – Franz Anton Bustelli, Swiss-born Bavarian porcelain modeller (died 1763)
May 6 – Ike no Taiga, Japanese painter and calligrapher (died 1776)
July 2 - Václav Bernard Ambrosi, Czech miniature painter (died 1806)
July 16 – Joshua Reynolds, English painter, specializing in portraits (died 1792)
October 17 – Pierre-Antoine Baudouin, French miniature painter and engraver (died 1769)
October 23 - Pierre-François Basan, French engraver (died 1797)
November 14 – Johann Ludwig Aberli, Swiss landscape painter and etcher (died 1786)
date unknown
Giorgio Anselmi, Italian painter (died 1797)
Johann Karl Auerbach, Austrian painter (died 1786)
William Baillie, Irish engraver (died 1792)
Maria Carowsky, Swedish artist (died 1793)
Giovanni Battista Chiappe, Italian painter (died 1765)
Gavin Hamilton, Scottish neoclassical history painter (died 1798)
Giacomo Leonardis, Italian engraver and etcher (died 1794)
Domenico Quaglio the Elder, Italian painter (died 1760)
Antonio González Velázquez, Spanish late-Baroque painter (died 1793)

Deaths
February 11 - Heinrich Meyring, German sculptor (born 1628)
March – Lancelot Volders, Flemish painter (buried in Brussels on 23 March; born 1636)
October 19 – Sir Godfrey Kneller, English court painter (born 1646)
December 6 – Amalia Pachelbel, German painter and engraver (born 1688)
date unknown
Giacinto Garofalini, Italian painter (born 1661)
Maria Cattarina Locatelli, Italian painter from Bologna (born unknown)
Angelo Massarotti, Italian painter active in his native Cremona (born 1653)

References

 
Years of the 18th century in art
1720s in art